Stenoprora is a genus of moths of the family Erebidae. The genus was erected by George Hampson in 1926.

Species
Stenoprora adelopis (Lower, 1903) New South Wales
Stenoprora apicinota (Turner, 1944) Queensland
Stenoprora eurycycla Turner, 1936 Queensland
Stenoprora lophota (Lower, 1903) Western Australia
Stenoprora perspicua (Turner, 1941) Queensland
Stenoprora triplax Turner, 1944 Queensland

References

Calpinae
Moth genera